Bout It! is the third studio album by the hardcore punk band Deez Nuts. It was released on April 8, 2013 through Century Media. AllMusic wrote that the album was mainly hardcore punk, edging on metalcore.

Track listing

References

2013 albums
Deez Nuts (band) albums
Century Media Records albums
UNFD albums